August Langhoffer (17 April 1861 – 29 April 1940) was a Croatian entomologist and a professor of zoology at the University of Zagreb. The blind cave beetle Anophthalmus langhofferi is named after him.

Langhoffer was born in Kysáč to teaching parents Johann Tobias and Emilia née Reuss. He was educated at various grammar schools before he went to the  University of Zagreb (1879-1883) and University of Jena (1883-84). He received a doctorate in 1888 from Jena for his dissertation Beiträge zur Kenntnis der Mundteile der Dipteren. He taught in various schools including the Nautical School in Buccari and in 1895 become a professor of zoology at the University of Zagreb and headed the Zoological Museum. He published on the mouthparts of Diptera, Hymenoptera, the systematics of bark beetles, and on cave beetles. He retired in 1927 and died at Zagreb.

References

External links 
 Works by Langhoffer

1861 births
1940 deaths
Croatian entomologists
University of Jena alumni